The Lepsius L Pyramid is the remain of a pyramid complex built in Dahshur, approximately  east of the Red Pyramid of pharaoh Sneferu of the Fourth Dynasty. The identity of the pyramid owner is unknown. The site was initially visited by Karl Richard Lepsius during his 1842–45 expedition to Egypt. He provided a brief description and catalogued it as 'Steinpyramide L' in his pyramid list. The site was then excavated by Rainer Stadelmann in 1986.

Pyramid complex 
Lepsius measured the base of the pyramid as being  square; Stadelmann measured it as being . Lepsius further identified a path leading towards the Red Pyramid which may have been the pyramid's causeway. He also noted the presence of a necropolis adjoining the pyramid's north side. Stadelmann discovered large limestone blocks that are presumed to have been intended for the pyramid's substructure, a mudbrick construction ramp, and the remains of Fourth Dynasty era pottery.

Ownership 
Ludwig Borchardt and Stadelmann have ascribed the pyramid to Menkauhor of the Fifth Dynasty of Egypt, though this identification is contested. Borchardt cites a royal decree issued by Pepi I of the Sixth Dynasty that was uncovered in the pyramid town of Sneferu's Red Pyramid and mentions Menkauhor's pyramid as supporting the assignment:

Menkauhor is, however, also associated with the Headless Pyramid in Saqqara, another pyramid with contested ownership. This attribution is supported by Jean-Philippe Lauer and Jean Leclant because of the displacement of the causeway of Teti's pyramid; Vito Maragioglio and Celeste Rinaldi because of the manner of the construction of the Headless Pyramid's substructure; and Zahi Hawass based on the architectural style of the pyramid complex and the extensive use of quality materials typical of the era.

Dieter Arnold after examining a re-used block from Amenemhat I's pyramid believed to originate from Menkauhor's pyramid determined that it originated from neither Lepsius XXIX nor Lepsius L and concluded that Menkauhor's pyramid was yet to be uncovered, probably in South Saqqara.

References

Sources 

 
 
 
 
 
 
 
 
 

Pyramids of the Fourth Dynasty of Egypt
1843 archaeological discoveries
Dahshur